Ojoraptorsaurus is a genus of oviraptorosaurian dinosaur from the late Cretaceous. Ojoraptorsaurus is only known from pubic bones found at the Naashoibito Member of the Ojo Alamo Formation dating to the early Maastrichtian, about 69 million years ago. It was first named by Robert M. Sullivan, Steven E. Jasinski and Mark P.A. van Tomme in 2011 and the type species is Ojoraptorsaurus boerei. The generic name combines a reference to the formation with a Latin raptor, "plunderer", and a Latinised Greek saurus, "lizard". The specific name honours oceanographer Arjan Boeré who found the specimen.

Description 

The holotype of Ojoraptorsaurus is SMP VP-1458, an incomplete pair of fused pubes. Due to the fusion of the pubes, this specimen is believed to have been a mature individual. Most caenagnathid species are known from very few remains, and Ojoraptorsaurus is no exception. The holotype was compared to well-described pubic remains of other oviraptorosaurians, namely Microvenator, Epichirostenotes, Nomingia, and CM 78001 (now known as Anzu). It shares with the latter three taxa an enclosed fossa on the inside edge of the pubis near the acetabular rim, a trait which may be diagnostic to caenagnathids (in which case Nomingia is a caenagnathid). Ojoraptorsaurus's fossa is further away from the acetabular rim than those of the other species, a feature characteristic to the genus. Among compared oviraptorosaurians, Ojoraptorsaurus is most similar to Epichirostenotes, a genus differentiated from Chirostenotes in the same paper that Ojoraptorsarus was described in. By comparing pubic proportions with those of CM 78001 (Anzu), Ojoraptorsaurus has been estimated to have been about 1.8 to 2.1 meters (5.9 to 6.9 feet) in length, about 20% smaller than Epichirostenotes.

Ojoraptorsaurus differs from other caenagnathids due to possessing the following autapomorphies:
 A “spoon-shaped” depression on the anterior dorsal surface of the pubic boot.
 An enclosed fossa on the inside edge of the pubis which lies 1 centimeter away from the acetabular rim.
 The portion of the pubic shaft directly above the pubic boot being slightly anteriorly convex.
 A sub-trapezoidal iliac peduncle articular surface of the pubis.

See also
 Timeline of oviraptorosaur research

References

Caenagnathids
Late Cretaceous dinosaurs of North America
Fossil taxa described in 2011
Paleontology in New Mexico
Ojo Alamo Formation
Maastrichtian genus first appearances
Maastrichtian genus extinctions